Higueras is a Spanish municipality in the comarca of Alto Palancia, in the Province of Castellón, Valencian Community. In 2015, the population was 91.

History
The village was first mentioned in the 13th century as Torre de la Higuera.

Geography
The municipality, part of the judicial district of Segorbe, borders with Caudiel, Montán, Pavías and Torralba del Pinar.

Demographics

References

External links

 Higueras official website

Municipalities in the Province of Castellón
Alto Palancia